The second season of the television comedy series Arrested Development aired between November 7, 2004 and April 17, 2005, on Fox in the United States. It consisted of 18 episodes, each running approximately 22 minutes in length. The second season was released on DVD in region 1 on October 11, 2005, in region 2 on January 23, 2006 and in region 4 on March 15, 2006. 

The show's storyline centers on the Bluth family, a formerly wealthy, habitually dysfunctional family and is presented in a continuous format, incorporating hand-held camera work, narration, archival photos and historical footage.

Cast 

 Jason Bateman as Michael Bluth
 Portia de Rossi as Lindsay Fünke
 Will Arnett as Gob Bluth
 Michael Cera as George Michael Bluth
 Alia Shawkat as Maeby Fünke
 Tony Hale as Buster Bluth
 David Cross as Tobias Fünke
 Jeffrey Tambor as George and Oscar Bluth
 Jessica Walter as Lucille Bluth
 Ron Howard as Narrator (uncredited)

Episodes

Reception

Critical reception 
In its second season, Arrested Development was met with widespread critical acclaim. On Rotten Tomatoes, the season has an approval rating of 94% with an average score of 8.3 out of 10 based on 18 reviews. The website's critical consensus reads, "Arrested Developments second season doubles down on the absurd antics and densely layered gags, cementing the Bluths as TV's best worst family." On the review aggregator website Metacritic, the second season scored 88 out of 100, based on 17 reviews, indicating "Universal acclaim."

Awards and nominations 
In 2005, the second season received eleven Emmy nominations in seven categories with one win. It was nominated for Outstanding Comedy Series, Outstanding Lead Actor in a Comedy Series (Jason Bateman), Outstanding Supporting Actor in a Comedy Series (Jeffrey Tambor), Outstanding Supporting Actress in a Comedy Series (Jessica Walter), Outstanding Writing for a Comedy Series (Barbie Adler for "Sad Sack" and Brad Copeland for "Sword of Destiny"); Outstanding Casting for a Comedy Series; Outstanding Single-Camera Picture Editing for a Comedy Series (three nominations). The episode "Righteous Brothers", written by Mitchell Hurwitz and Jim Vallely won for Outstanding Writing for a Comedy Series.

The second season also received two Golden Globe nominations in two categories with one win. It was nominated for Best Series  Musical or Comedy, and Jason Bateman won for Best Performance in a Musical or Comedy.

Home media
The second season was released on DVD in region 1 on October 11, 2005, in region 2 on January 23, 2006 and in region 4 on March 15, 2006. Special features include commentary by creator Mitchell Hurwitz and cast members on "Good Grief", "Ready, Aim, Marry Me!" and "Righteous Brothers"; deleted and extended scenes; Season One in 3 Minutes overview; blooper reel; "The Immaculate Election" Campaign Videos.

References

External links 
 

 
2004 American television seasons
2005 American television seasons